Kill the Poor is a 2003 American drama film directed by Alan Taylor from a screenplay by Daniel Handler, based on the 1988 novel of the same name by Joel Rose. The film is set in Manhattan's Alphabet City in the early 1980s, when the neighborhood was a center of illegal drug activity. The film's title is inspired by the Dead Kennedys' song "Kill the Poor".

Kill the Poor premiered at the Tribeca Film Festival on May 9, 2003, and received a limited theatrical release in the United States on January 6, 2006, by IFC Films. It received mixed reviews from critics.

Plot
Kill the Poor begins with a fire in the apartment of tough guy Carlos DeJesus and his trouble-making son, Segundo. The screenplay then focuses on the other tenants of the rundown building in an attempt to determine who set the blaze.

The other principals are:

 Joe Peltz, a young man who ignored his uncle's warnings to bring his wife Annabelle and their young child into the neighborhood where his Jewish grandparents had their start in America
 Spike, an aspiring found-object sculptor
 Delilah, a flamboyant gay man
 Butch, a presumptuous graduate student
 Scarlet, the tenement's resident floozy
 Negrito, a fixture in the neighborhood

A shared distrust of Carlos and Segundo unites this eclectic group and prompts them to hold "co-op" meetings with one goal: eviction of Carlos and Segundo DeJesus.

Cast
 David Krumholtz as Joe Peltz
 Clara Bellar as Annabelle Peltz
 Paul Calderón as Carlos DeJesus
 Jon Budinoff as Segundo
 Cliff Gorman as Yakov
 Damian Young as Delilah
 Heather Burns as Scarlet
 Otto Sanchez as Negrito
 Zak Orth as Butch
 Larry Gilliard, Jr. as "Spike"

Release
Kill the Poor was first screened at the Tribeca Film Festival on May 9, 2003. It was then released on January 6, 2006 at the IFC Center in New York City.

Reception

Critical response
The review aggregator website Rotten Tomatoes reported an approval rating of 25%, with an average rating of 5.3/10, based on 8 reviews.

References

 Lee, Nathan. (2006, January 6). Ragtag Tenants in a Shabby Part of Town. The New York Times, p. B18

External links
 

2003 films
Films based on American novels
Films directed by Alan Taylor
Films with screenplays by Daniel Handler
2003 drama films
American drama films
2000s English-language films
2000s American films
Mr. Mudd films